Les Grands Chemins ("The Great Roads") is a 1951 novel by the French writer Jean Giono. It was the basis for the 1963 film Of Flesh and Blood, directed by Christian Marquand.

References

1951 French novels
French novels adapted into films
French-language novels
Novels by Jean Giono
Éditions Gallimard books